Elizabeth Fletcher later Elizabeth Wedderburn (December 1731 – 18 December 1758) was a Scottish scholar educated in Edinburgh. She had a short, but important life introducing many of the leading figures of the Scottish Enlightenment to people of influence. She was mainly known as Miss Betty Fletcher.

Life 
Fletcher was born in 1731. She was the penultimate child of eight born to Lady Elizabeth (born Kinloch) and Andrew Fletcher, Lord Milton.

She had no formal education but she was clever. She had spent three years at Miss Aylesworth's school in Chelsea, but it is reported that she would have learned singing and about music but nothing more academic. In 1745 she finished in Chelsea and in Edinburgh she was given further education by private tutors.

In 1747 the family moved from Saltoun Hall to Brunstane House east of Edinburgh.

Her father had great influence, especially as he knew Archibald Campbell, Lord Ilay, later the third duke of Argyll. Each summer she would be invited to Inveraray Castle, as this was the family seat of her father's business fiend Lord Ilay.

She knew the historian William Robertson, the historian, David Hume and Adam Ferguson the philosophers, Adam Smith the economist, and John Home. Because these men knew Elizabeth Fletcher, she introduced them to her father, Lord Milton. Via Lord Milton they met Lord Ilay, and Ilay had the ear of Sir Robert Walpole. Another acquaintance she met at Invererary was the young architect Robert Adam. Adam took a dislike to her, her sister Mally and her mother. 

She married Captain John Wedderburn of Gosford but the marriage was short as he was posted to the West Indies. It is said that Fletcher had sufficient influence to have her new husband sent home, but despite the advice of the peers, she did not interfere.

Death and legacy
She was however pregnant and this would end her life. She gave birth to a daughter and she  died on 18 December 1758 having said "I have done my duty to my husband's honour, but my doing so has cost me my life". Her husband remarried, Mary Hamilton, and he would have fourteen more children and in the last year of his life he became a Halkett baronets and he changed his name to Halkett. Elizabeth's daughter was brought up knowing that she a different mother to step-brothers and sisters. Her step-brother would become Sir Charles Halkett, 5th Baronet of Pitfirrane.

References 

1731 births
1758 deaths
Scottish socialites